Kelyvn may refer to:

People
 Kelvyn Jones (born 1953), British quantitative geography professor
 Kelvyn Bell (born 1956), American guitarist and vocalist
 Kelvyn Cullimore, Jr. (born 1958), American businessman and politician
 Kelvyn Alp (born 1971), New Zealand politician and activist
 Kelvyn Igwe (born 1987), Nigerian football defender
 Kelvyn Boy (born 1991), Kelvyn Brown, Ghanaian afrobeat singer
 Kelvyn (footballer) (born 1999), Kelvyn Ramos da Fonseca, Brazilian football left-back

Places
 Kelvyn Park, park in Chicago, Illinois
 Kelvyn Park High School, high school in Chicago, Illinois

See also
 Kelvin (disambiguation)